The Andrés Bello Municipality is one of the 23 municipalities (municipios) that makes up the Venezuelan state of Mérida and, according to a 2007 population estimate by the National Institute of Statistics of Venezuela, the municipality has a population of 14,029.  The town of La Azulita is the shire town of the Andrés Bello Municipality. The municipality is one of a number in Venezuela named "Andrés Bello Municipality", in honour of the writer Andrés Bello.

Demographics
The Andrés Bello Municipality, according to a 2007 population estimate by the National Institute of Statistics of Venezuela, has a population of 14,029 (up from 11,962 in 2000). This amounts to 1.7% of the state's population.

Government
The mayor of the Andrés Bello Municipality is Ramón Augusto Lobo Moreno, re-elected on October 31, 2004, with 81% of the vote.  The municipality is divided into one Parish (Capital Andrés Bello).

See also
La Azulita
Mérida
Municipalities of Venezuela

References

Municipalities of Mérida (state)